Nozema Zendstation The Hague is a  tower of reinforced concrete at The Hague, Netherlands. It was built in 1965.

See also
List of towers

External links
 Skyscraperpage.com

Buildings and structures completed in 1965
Buildings and structures in The Hague